Marown A.F.C. are a football club from Crosby in the parish of Marown in the Isle of Man. They compete in the Premier League of the Isle of Man Football League and wear a maroon and gold strip.  Home games are played at the Marown Memorial Playing Fields at Old Church Road, Crosby. The club was formed in 1950, and run teams ranging from  Under 6s to Under 16s and seniors. 

Current roles ( March 2023) :

Club Captain - Connor Gilbert. 
Club Secretary - Helen Withers.
Club Treasurer - Keir Morris.
Club Chairman - Neil Withers.
Club President - George Corkill.

History
The club was formed in 1950, and have won many honours and been a successful team throughout their existence.

In 1970-71 Marown won the Woods cup, Combination 2 and the Cowell Cup .

In 1984–85, Marown were promoted from Division Two to the First Division, but they were relegated three seasons later in 1987–88. They were again promoted in the 1990–91 season as runners-up to St Marys, but relegated again the following season. Their first FA Cup game was a 3-2 win against Corinthians. They were promoted again in 1997–98 as Division Two champions.

In both 1999–2000 and 2000–01 they finished in third place in the First Division, and in 2001–02 finished as runners-up to Peel and were losing finalists in the Railway Cup. They again finished as runners-up the following two seasons.

The reserve team won the Junior Cup in 2003–04. In the 2005–06 season, they escaped relegation by one point finishing with 24 points. However, the following season they were relegated, finishing bottom on just nine points.

The club has a reserve team that play in the Isle of Man Football Combination. They also have a Junior department, Marown Juniors, with teams from Under-7 to Under-16. In May 2017 the Under-16 side reached the final of the Under-16s cup, but lost 2-0 to a dominant Ayre United side. On 11 August 2008, the Under-10 team represented the Isle of Man at the English FA's National Football Festival held at Wembley Stadium in London.

In 2012-13 season the club won club of the year.

The club won Division Two in 2014–15 and gained promotion to the Premier Division.

The club were relegated the season after, but in 2017-18 they won Division 2 and were promoted back to the Premier League.

Since promotion in 2017-18 the club have had a permanent stay in the Isle of Man’s top division.

Ground

Home games are played at the fortress which is Marown Memorial Playing Fields, which was established 4 years before the football club, in 1946. The land was donated by Harley Cunningham and is dedicated to those who served their country during two world wars.

Colours and badge

Marown AFC currently play in a maroon and gold strip and have done since throughout their history.

Team Honours

Club
IOMFA Club of the year
Winners 2012-13
Fred Faragher fair play trophy
Winners 1970, 1971, 1972, 1973, 1975, 1976, 1980, 1985, 1986, 1987, 1988, 1992, 1993, 1994, 1997, 1998, 2009

First team

League
Division One (0)
Runners-up 2001-02, 2002–03, 2003–04
Division Two (3)
Champions 1997–98, 2014–15,2017–18
Runners-up 1954-55, 1958–59, 1971-71, 1975–76, 1976–77, 1984–85, 1990-91 2011–12

Cup
Railway Cup (0)
Runners-up 2001-02, 2005–06
Woods Cup (3)
Winners 1970-71, 1984–85, 1997–98
Runners-up 2013-14, 2017–18
Hospital Cup (1)
Winners 1953-54
Runners-up 1952-53,
Gold Cup (0)
Winners
Runners-up 1993-94, 2011–12

Reserve team

League

Combination One (1)
Winners 2001/02,
Combination Two (8)
Winners 1970-71, 1975–76, 1980–81, 1981–82, 1983–84, 1990–91, 2008-2009, 2011–12

Cup
Junior Cup (1)
Winners 2003–04
Runners-up 1965-66

Over 35s Masters

Masters
FA Cup (1)
Winners 2013–14

Juniors

League
Under 16’s B League (1)
Winners 2017-18
Under 14’s B League (1)
Winners 2014-15
Under 13’s A League (1)
Winners 2013-14
Under 11’s B League (1)
Winners 2012-13

Cup
Cowell Cup (1)
Winners 1970-71
U16 Reg Lunt Plate (1)
Winners 2017-18
U12 Office World Cup (1)
Winners 2015-16
U11 Oxford cup (1)
Winners 2010-11

Women

Division 2(1)
Winners 2003-04

Individual Honours

Division 1 Player of the year
Anthony Halsall 2001-02
Silver boot
Juan Killip 1997-98, 2011–12
Women’s Division 2 leading goalscorer
Jackie Ashman 2000/01, 2003–04

References

External links
Official website 
Marown Juniors website (out of date)

Football clubs in the Isle of Man
Association football clubs established in 1950
1950 establishments in the Isle of Man